École Privée Belge de Lubumbashi (EPBL) is an international Belgian school in Lubumbashi, Democratic Republic of the Congo.

Location

It is situated in Avenue Kashobwe, 13, not far from the Kipopo lake.

History

The Belgian school was established in 1971. It follows the curriculum of the Wallonia-Brussels Federation.

References

External links
 École Privée Belge de Lubumbashi 

Buildings and structures in Lubumbashi
International schools in the Democratic Republic of the Congo
Belgian international schools
1971 establishments in Zaire
Educational institutions established in 1971
Elementary and primary schools in the Democratic Republic of the Congo
High schools and secondary schools in the Democratic Republic of the Congo
International high schools